Actaeodes is a genus of crabs in the family Xanthidae, containing the following species:
 Actaeodes consobrinus (A. Milne-Edwards, 1873)
 Actaeodes hirsutissimus (Rüppell, 1830)
 Actaeodes mutatus Guinot, 1976
 Actaeodes quinquelobatus Garth & Kim, 1983
 Actaeodes semoni (Ortmann, 1894)
 Actaeodes tomentosus (H. Milne-Edwards, 1834)

References

Xanthoidea